Lothbury Station may refer to:

 Lothbury tube station
 Lothbury Telegraph Station, the hub of the British Telegraph system.